The Aarhus Symfoniorkester (Aarhus Symphony Orchestra) is the principal orchestra for the Danish city of Aarhus.

Description
Established in 1935 as Aarhus By-Orkester (Aarhus City Orchestra), since 1982 it has performed most of its concerts in Musikhuset Aarhus which became its permanent home in 2007. Every year, the orchestra performs about 35 concerts in an around Aarhus. It also gives performances of chamber music, participates in school concerts, and is the orchestra for the Jyske Opera. The director since 2003 has been Giancarlo Andretta.

References

External links
Official website

Danish orchestras
Organizations established in 1935
Music in Aarhus